KHCV (104.3 FM, "La Estación de la Familia Radio") is a class A radio station that broadcasts a Spanish Contemporary Christian format from Mecca, California.

History
On September 5, 2014, the station began broadcasting as KFUT before changing its call sign to the current KHCV on February 4, 2016. On September 21, 2020, CV 104.3 flipped from adult contemporary to an oldies format with no other changes.

On August 2, 2021, KHCV changed their format from oldies to Spanish contemporary Christian, branded as "La Estación de la Familia Radio".

Previous logo

References

External links

Mass media in Riverside County, California
Radio stations established in 2015
HCV (FM)
2015 establishments in California
HCV (FM)